The Bass of Inverurie is the remnant of a motte-and-bailey castle based on a natural mound about  high and  in diameter to the south of the town of Inverurie in Aberdeenshire, Scotland. The Bass and the adjacent Little Bass to the east are the remains of the castle of Inverurie, the administrative centre of the provincial lordship of the Garioch in the 12th and 13th centuries.

References

Castles in Aberdeenshire